Time trials have been part of cycling for more than a hundred years. The first time trial was run in 1895 after a ban on road racing was imposed by the National Cyclists' Union. It wasn't until 1939 that the time trial made its world stage debut as an official stage of the Tour de France. It was originally used as a method of drawing more people to listen to the Grand Tour on the newly available radio broadcast of the 1939 race. The main thing that distinguished the first time-trial from the traditional form of road racing was that the riders started at intervals instead of one large group and they raced against the clock instead of each other. Unlike road racing where the a rider can hang in the peloton and draft off of other riders to conserve energy, time trial races put the rider out alone on the course. There are no breaks and no one to draft off, causing a rider to push as hard as they can the entire race. Bicycles have also evolved to accommodate this new form of racing, with most of the breakthroughs occurring in the last 40–50 years with the introduction of triathlons.

Components of the bike 

There are several different aspects of a time trial bike that give the bike its wind cheating ability. 
 Frame
 Component group
 Cranks
 Wheels
 Aerobars
 Hydration systems
 Helmets
 Time-trial clothing

Time-trial vs. road bikes  
While both road bikes and time-trial originate from the old bikes used in the Grand Tours, these two classes of bikes have evolved in such a way as to cheat the wind and the clock and retained very few similarities. When the first time-trials were introduced into the Tour de France, little consideration was given to the type of machine the riders would use. The bikes they used for all of the group stages worked just as well as anything that existed during the time period, so that is what was used. Road bikes have existed as competition racing machines for almost 100 years before the earliest modern time-trial/triathlon bike made its debut in the cycling world. The traditional road frame, or diamond frame, which is still used on bicycles today, appeared  barely a hundred years ago. At the time, it was considered one of the most technological advancement. Technology and science together have contributed to the development of today's time-trial machines. The average road bike in the hands of a professional cyclist averages speeds between 20–28 miles per hour depending on the terrain.

Component groups
Every bike is made up of a series of components. The drive-train components are what make the bike go. These consist of the bike chain, front and rear derailleurs, crankset, and bottom bracket. The drive-train is the one part of the bike that doesn't change significantly between road bikes and time-trial bikes. The three main companies that produce component groups are Campagnolo, Shimano, and SRAM. Campagnolo is the oldest of the three, founded in 1933. Component groups are fairly universal on road bikes and time trial bikes. Both use the same group-sets and depending on the rider and the venue of the practice or race, the same gearing might also be used. The cranks are the main component difference between road and time-trial bikes. A standard crank, which is found on road bike, has two chain-rings and a gearing of 53×39, which means that the large chain-ring has 53 teeth on it and the little ring has 39 teeth. The teeth grab the chain and propel the bike forward. A standard time-trial crank typically has a gearing of 54×42 and has solid chain-rings instead of the hollow metal rings found on road cranks. High end time-trial chain-rings are made from solid carbon fiber with the exception of the teeth.

Aerobars
Traditional road bikes had drop bars that kept the rider in an upright position which created a lot of drag. The new triathlon bikes still had the drop bars, but they incorporated aerobars onto the handlebar. These new bars allowed the riders to get into a wind cheating position. Aerobars come in two different styles: clip-on systems and integrated systems. Clip-on aerobars attach to any handlebars to give the rider the aero advantage on a tri-bike. Integrated systems mean the aerobars and the basebars are all one system and attached to the bike as one whole piece rather than separate components like a clip-on system. There are a few advantages to this; the main one being that an integrated system allows the rider to get into a much lower position and thus be more aerodynamic. On the down side, these types of systems usually only work on tri bikes unless the owner wants to have their road bike completely overhauled into a tri bike. To get the best aero advantage out of the bars, companies spend countless hours in wind tunnels adjusting the aerobars.

Wheels
Beside the frame, the wheels are one of the most vital parts of the bike when it comes to performance. When designing wheels, companies take two major factors into consideration: the weight of the wheel and its shape. The shape of the wheels depends on what its primary use is going to be. Most racing wheels are made with carbon fiber rims and have deeper rims, otherwise known as "deep dishes." While these wheels have been proven to increase a rider's power up to 30%, they can also affect the stability of the bike, especially with crosswinds. They also affect the turning radius of the bike and the rider comfort. These wheels have deeper rims in order to better deflect the air around the wheel. Traditionally wheels come in two sizes, 650c and 700c. The 650c wheels have the advantage of being smaller and lighter which give them a slight advantage on hills but because they do not do as good of a job displacing weight around the bike they are an option for smaller riders. The 700c wheels are the universal size that is used on almost every bike made today. On the rare occasion, a 650c front wheel is paired with a 700c rear wheel to gain better aerodynamics  Some of the top racing wheels are built by companies like HED Cycling Products, Zipp, DT Swiss, Shimano, Easton, and Reynolds among others. These carbon fiber specialty wheels are typically only used by individuals who intend to compete, partially because the price tag on a given wheelset can run from $1,300 (Sram S60) up to $6,000 (Reynolds RZR 92.2)

Specialized hydration systems
Hydration is a major part of an athlete's daily life. It is essential for their success both during practice and while competing. As bike technology has evolved, so has the technology for re-fueling the athlete. On a traditional road bike, which has a standard triangular frame, there is more than enough room for two large water-bottles. At most, modern time-trial bikes will hold one water bottle within the frame. High-end time-trial bikes do not have attachments for water bottles within the frame. This lack of water bottle attachments and the need to keep the aero-position throughout a race has not surprisingly led to the development of aero-hydration systems. Due to this lack of water-bottle storage, there are two main types of aero-hydration systems; behind the saddle (seat) and between the aero-bars. Rear-mounted hydration systems attach to the rail on the saddle and are positioned to smooth the air flow over the rider. These types of systems can either consist of a simple seat-mounted water bottle holder that typically holds two water bottles, or a seat-mounted bladder with a drinking tube running along the frame up to the rider. Front-mounted hydration systems have aero properties similar to those of a rear-mounted system, to create as little wind resistance as possible. A front-mounted system is almost always tucked between the aerobars. The most commonly used type of front-mounted hydration system is a water bottle that tucks between the aerobars with a straw that extends up to the rider but can be folded out of the way when not in use.

Aero savings
Time-trial bikes provide a significant aerodynamic advantage over standard road bikes. If a rider averages 75–80 minutes to complete a 40 km course on a road bike, using a traditional metal frame, shallow rimmed wheels, and standard road bike components, including a down-tube mounted water-bottle, then switching these road components to the aerodynamic counterparts could shave the following times off their total ride.

Positioning
Pro and elite level cyclists turn to the wind-tunnels to constantly seek refinement and improvements in their individual time trial on-the-bike positioning. Professionally measured, out-on-the-road tested positioning (arms inwards as much as physiologically possible, knees in pedalling, head and body in better alignment in the time trialing, aero position, etc.) will see as much as a 6-minutes improvement in non-aero or former poor aero positioning. Empirical evidence shows that it is far more important to aerodynamically improve a rider's position than to rely solely on technology in order to better one's time trialing results.

Aerobars 
These will bring the rider forward and drop you into an aero tuck with a flatter back and narrow elbows. Time saved: 3–5 minutes.

Better ride 
Knowing one's physical capabilities and the course will mean one can ride the 40 km in the quickest way possible. Time saved: 1–3 mins.

Aero helmet
Smooth airflow reduces drag around the head. Time saved: up to 1 min.

Aero drinking bottle 
Allows hands-free hydration, reducing drag as there is no arm movement to interfere with airflow. Time saved: 30–45 secs.

Bar-end levers
Changing gear without having to move from a tucked aero position means you stay in control, relaxed and fast. Time saved: 30 secs.

Tri suit 
Skin-tight Lycra has demonstrated 6% improvements in research. Time saved 30–45 secs (and quicker transitions).

Aero wheels 
A 50–80 mm deep aero front wheel and disc is the ultimate set-up but it’s a costly way to get faster. Time saved: 1–2 mins.

Lightweight aero frame 
Most of the gain is due to the aero position it allows, but the weight loss also helps a little. Time saved: 1–1:30 mins.

High-quality tires
These reduce frontal area and rolling resistance, significant for riders with lower power output. Time saved: 2–4 mins.

Cycling shoes 
Clipless, tri-specific shoes improve one's pedalling and cut transition time. Time saved: 30–60 secs.

Total time saved: 10–15 mins

References

Further reading
 Peveler, W. (2009). The Complete Book of Road Cycling and Racing. McGraw-Hill.
 Sloane, E. (1995). Sloane's Complete Book of Bicycling. New York: Fireside.
 Thompson, C. (2006). The Tour de France. London: University of California.
 Sidwells, C. (2003). Complete Bike Book. New York: DK Publishing.
 Cycling Magazine. (1994). Complete Guide to Maintenance and Repair. Emmaus: Rodale Press.
 Hickok, R. (1992). Cycling. The Encyclopedia of North America Sports History. New York: Facts or File.
 Ballantine, R. (1992). Richard's Ultimate Bicycle Book. New York: Dorling Kindersley Inc.
 Chabroux, V., Nsi Mba, M., Sainton, P., & Favier, D. (2010). Wake Characteristics of Time Trial Helmets Using PIV-3C Technique. Proceedings of the 15th International Symposium on Applications of Laser Techniques to Fluid Mechanics (pp. 1–12). Marseille: University of the Mediterranee.
 Culp, B. (2009, January). Cervelo Rules Kona Bike Count. Triathlete, 297, 90.

Road bicycle racing terminology